Oxymyrrhine is a genus of flowering plants belonging to the family Myrtaceae.

Its native range is Southwestern Australia.

Species
Species:

Oxymyrrhine cordata 
Oxymyrrhine coronata 
Oxymyrrhine gracilis 
Oxymyrrhine plicata

References

Myrtaceae
Myrtaceae genera